Aczél is a Hungarian surname meaning "steel". Notable people with the surname include:

 Amir Aczel (1950–2015), Israeli-born American mathematics writer of Hungarian origin; author of books on mathematicians and the history of mathematics
 György Aczél (1917–1991), Hungarian communist politician
 János Aczél (royal secretary) (died 1523), Hungarian poet
 János Aczél (mathematician) (1924–2020), Hungarian-Canadian mathematician
 József Aczél (1900–1945), Hungarian footballer
 Peter Aczel (born 1941), British mathematician
 Steve Aczel (born 1954), Hungarian/Australian boxer of the 1980s, '90s and 2000s 
 Zoltán Aczél (born 1967), Hungarian footballer

See also 
 Aczel's anti-foundation axiom

Hungarian-language surnames